Annette Gigon / Mike Guyer Architects is an architectural office based in Zurich, Switzerland. It is led by the Swiss-born architect Annette Gigon and the U.S.-born architect Mike Guyer. Works by the office have been widely published and are admired for their formal logic and legibility, their sensitive handling of materials, and their skillful use of color.

Education and academic careers
Annette Gigon was born on May 24, 1959 in Herisau, Switzerland. She graduated in architecture in 1984 from ETH Zurich. She worked in the offices of Marbach and Rüegg 1984–1986 and Herzog & de Meuron 1986–1988, and also in her own practice from 1987.

Mike Guyer was born on July 5, 1958 in Columbus, Ohio. He attended primary and high school in Zurich, and graduated in architecture in 1984 from ETH Zurich. He worked at Office for Metropolitan Architecture in Rotterdam 1984–1987. He established his own office in 1987, and was an assistant lecturer under Prof. Hans Kollhoff at ETH Zurich 1987–1988.

Gigon and Guyer were visiting professors at EPF Lausanne 2001–2002, and visiting professors at ETH Zurich from 2008. Since 2012, they hold a joint Professorship for Architecture And Construction at ETH Zurich.
Both are members of the Federation of Swiss Architects (BSA), and Annette Gigon is a member of the Academy of Arts, Berlin.

Practice

Gigon and Guyer established Annette Gigon / Mike Guyer Architects in 1989. As of 2011, the practice consisted of the two founding partners, an office manager, seven team leaders, and about 50 co-workers. It wins the majority of its commissions by taking 1st Prize in open or invited competitions.

Gigon/Guyer established its reputation in the 1990s through its work on houses and museums, notably the Kirchner Museum in Davos, devoted to the art of Ernst Ludwig Kirchner, and Museum Liner in Appenzell. In 1998 it won 1st Prize in a competition for the design of the archaeological Museum and Park Kalkreise in Osnabrück, Germany, near the site of the ancient Battle of the Teutoburg Forest. It is noticeable that the firm soonly attracted international attention after its museum designs, such as the already mentioned Kirchner Museum in Davos, the Museum Extension in Winterthur, Kunstmuseum Appenzell, or the Archaeological Museum and Park in Kalkriese near Osnabrück, Germany. The other museum (the Swiss Museum of Transport in Lucerne) has later expanded the list.

Since 2000, the practice has expanded its range to include residential development projects (many of which have won the "Good Architecture" awards of the municipalities in which they are located) and office buildings.

Recently, Gigon/Guyer have completed several important projects in Zürich West, a former industrial district. They include Prime Tower, Switzerland’s tallest building from 2011 to 2015, and a new office complex on Lagerstrasse, a collaborative project with Max Dudler and David Chipperfield. In the same district, they have designed a residential tower, office building, and two contemporary art museums as additions to Löwenbräu Areal, a former brewery and listed industrial landmark.

Characteristics

According to Fiona McLachlan, a practicing architect who teaches at the University of Edinburgh, the buildings of Gigon/Guyer are "spatially clear, legible, and logical", with a "simplicity of form derived predominantly from function." The museum projects typically employ a subdued, material-based palette, with a series of simple, white-painted spaces in the interior and exteriors that "avoid being bland, characterless containers by their poetic use of materials." But many of their other projects utilize strong colors inside and outside, often chosen together with artist Harald Müller, a frequent collaborator.

Selected projects 

1989–1992 Kirchner Museum Davos
1993–1995 Extension Kunstmuseum Winterthur
1992–1996 Davos Sports Center
1994–1996 Housing Development Broëlberg I, Kirchberg
1995–1998 Two Houses, Zurich
1996–1998 Museum Liner, Appenzell
1997–1999 Signal Box, Zurich
1998–2000 Three Houses on Susenbergstrasse, Zurich
1999–2002 Archaeological Museum und Park Kalkriese, Osnabrück, Germany
2001–2003 Espace de l'art concret, Mouans-Sartoux, France
2002–2004 Art Gallery Henze & Ketterer, Wichtrach
2006–2007 Detached House, Canton Grisons
2003–2009 Housing development projects in Zurich, Wädenswil, Dietikon, Schlieren
2005–2009 Swiss Museum of Transport, Entrance Building, Lucerne
2004–2011 Prime Tower Office High-rise, Zurich
2006–2012 Kunsthalle Zürich and Migros Museum für Gegenwartskunst, in Löwenbräu Art Complex, Zurich
2007–2013 Office Building Lagerstrasse House, Zurich
2009–2013 Würth Haus, Rorschach

Awards
 1994: Auszeichnungen für gute Bauten Graubünden
 2001: Auszeichnungen für gute Bauten Graubünden

Publications

Notes

Further reading
 El Croquis no. 102: Annette Gigon / Mike Guyer 1989–2000. Madrid:2000.
 
 a+u no. 434: Gigon / Guyer - matter, colour, light and space. Tokyo:2006.
 El Croquis no. 143: Gigon/Guyer 2001–2008. Madrid:2009.

External links

 Official website

Architecture firms of Switzerland
Swiss architects